Robbie Henderson (born 11 October 1982) is a Scottish footballer, who plays as a defender for Pollok F.C. in the Scottish Junior Football Association, West Region. He has also played in midfield during his career.

Career
Growing up young Robbie started as a chicken farmer in a place called Bonnybridge or as he prefers to call it Bonnybrigg.
Henderson stated in an interview that a young lad motivated him to play. He said that his name is Lewis. While Robbie wasn't the best football player he took inspiration from Lewis. Lewis was the best young football player he as ever seen.  
Henderson started his career on the books of Leeds United, before making his way to Scotland to sign for Scottish Premier League side Kilmarnock.

He never made an appearance for the Killie first team, partly due to a fractured eye socket at the hands of one of his team-mates, but was sent out on loan to Raith Rovers, and Queen of the South where he managed a few appearances at each club.

When he was released by Kilmarnock, he signed for Greenock Morton in the Scottish Football League Second Division as part of Peter Cormack and Dave McPherson's quickly put together side that were relegated to the bottom division. However, under John McCormack, Henderson won a championship medal for the third division.

After around 18 months at Morton, Henderson moved on to Stenhousemuir before leaving the senior game in 2007 to sign for Junior side Pollok after a deal with Berwick Rangers fell through after one appearance, then on to Bo'ness United until he was transfer listed in July 2008.

Henderson returned to the Junior game in March 2011 with Glenafton Athletic and captained the club to the West Super League First Division title in 2011–2012. He left Glenafton for Kirkintilloch Rob Roy in October the following season.

On 24 January 2016, Henderson join Arthurlie as assistant manager.

Honours
 Scottish Football League Third Division: 1
 2002–2003 (with Morton)

References

Sources

1982 births
Scottish Football League players
Scottish Junior Football Association players
Association football defenders
Leeds United F.C. players
Kilmarnock F.C. players
Raith Rovers F.C. players
Scottish footballers
Brechin City F.C. players
Queen of the South F.C. players
Greenock Morton F.C. players
Stenhousemuir F.C. players
Living people
Berwick Rangers F.C. players
Pollok F.C. players
Bo'ness United F.C. players
Glenafton Athletic F.C. players
Kirkintilloch Rob Roy F.C. players